Fisher is a suburb in the City of Mount Isa, Queensland, Australia.

Geography 
The Leichhard River flows north–south through the town of Mount Isa, dividing the suburbs of the town into "mineside" (west of the Leichhardt River) and "townside" (east of the Leichhardt River). Fisher is a "townside" suburb.

History 
Fisher was named on 1 September 1973 by the Queensland Place Names Board after Sir George Fisher, Chairman of Mount Isa Mines Ltd from 1953 to 1970. On 16 March 2001 the status of Fisher was changed from a locality to a suburb.

References 

City of Mount Isa
Suburbs in Queensland